Simon Sluga (born 17 March 1993) is a Croatian professional footballer who plays as a goalkeeper for Bulgarian club Ludogorets Razgrad and the Croatia national team.

Club career

Rijeka
In the first two seasons of his professional career HNK Rijeka loaned Sluga to Juventus Primavera and Verona Primavera. During the 2013–14 season he was loaned to NK Pomorac in Croatia's Druga HNL where he collected 31 caps and managed 17 clean sheets. He spent the 2014–15 Prva HNL on loan to NK Lokomotiva where he was capped on 26 occasions. He returned to Rijeka following the end of the loan and recorded his official game début on 19 July 2015 against Slaven Belupo. In August 2015, he was loaned to Spezia Calcio in Italy's Serie B.

Luton Town
On 19 July 2019, Sluga joined newly-promoted Championship side Luton Town for a club record fee of €1.5 million, signing a three-year contract. On 2 August 2019, Sluga made his first appearance for Luton in a 3–3 draw against Middlesbrough.

Ludogrets Razgrad
On 31 January 2022, Sluga joined First Professional Football League club Ludogorets Razgrad.

International career
He made his debut for Croatia on 11 June 2019 in a friendly against Tunisia, as a starter.

Career statistics

Club

International

Honours
HNK Rijeka
Croatian Football Cup: 2018–19
Individual

 Luton Town Player of the Season: 2020–21

References

External links
 

1993 births
Living people
People from Poreč
Association football goalkeepers
Croatian footballers
Croatia youth international footballers
Croatia under-21 international footballers
Croatia international footballers
UEFA Euro 2020 players
HNK Rijeka players
NK Pomorac 1921 players
NK Lokomotiva Zagreb players
Spezia Calcio players
Luton Town F.C. players
PFC Ludogorets Razgrad players
First Football League (Croatia) players
Croatian Football League players
English Football League players
First Professional Football League (Bulgaria) players
Croatian expatriate footballers
Expatriate footballers in Italy
Expatriate footballers in England
Expatriate footballers in Bulgaria
Croatian expatriate sportspeople in Italy
Croatian expatriate sportspeople in England
Croatian expatriate sportspeople in Bulgaria